Lucile L. Adams-Campbell (born December 30, 1953) is the first African-American woman to receive a PhD in epidemiology in the United States. She serves as the Professor of Oncology at Lombardi Comprehensive Cancer Center and associate director for Minority Health at the Georgetown University Medical Center. She is a Fellow of the National Academy of Medicine and the Washington DC Hall of Fame.

Early life and education 
Adams-Campell was born in Washington, D.C. Her father, David, was a linguist and her mother, Florence, was a teacher. Adams-Campbell received a B.S. in biology at Drexel University. As a student she worked as an apprentice on naval ships. She remained at Drexel University for her graduate studies, completing a master's program in Biomedical Science. For her doctoral studies Adams-Campbell joined the University of Pittsburgh Graduate School of Public Health, and graduated with a PhD in epidemiology in 1983. Her doctoral research considered hypertension in Black people. She worked at the University of Pittsburgh as a postdoctoral researcher until 1987.

Research and career 
In 1995 she was appointed Director of the Howard University Cancer Center. At the time she was the only Black woman to lead any cancer institute. Her research primarily focuses on understanding health disparities, especially cancers such as breast, prostate and colon cancers that disproportionately affect African-Americans. Adams-Campbell's work uses clinical trials, cancer epidemiology and etiology along with lifestyle interventions and has led to over 200 peer-reviewed publications and international recognition as an expert in minority health and health disparities research. Currently Adams-Campbell is a professor of oncology at the Lombardi Comprehensive Cancer Center at Georgetown University Medical Center. She is also the associate Director for Minority Health and Health Disparities Research, Senior Associate Dean for Community Outreach and Engagement, and is the Program Director of the Master's in Epidemiology Program, Graduate School of Arts and Sciences at Georgetown University in addition to being a member of the National Academy of Medicine.

Awards, honors and memberships 
 2000 University of Pittsburgh Distinguished Alumni Award
 2008 Elected Fellow of the National Academy of Medicine
 2010 University of Pittsburgh Legacy Institute
 2015 member of Dietary Guidelines Advisory Committee
 Previously served as Chair of the American Association for Cancer Research.
 National Academy of Medicine's National Cancer Policy Forum
 Board of Scientific Counselors of the National Human Genome Research Institute
 D.C. Hall of Fame
 Council Chair of American Association for Cancer Research's Women in Cancer Research (WICR)

Selected publications 

A comprehensive list of all publications can be found here.

Personal life 
Adams-Campbell is married to Thomas Campbell, who she attended high school with in Washington, D.C., but did not properly meet until her undergraduate degree at Drexel University.

References 

1953 births
Living people
African-American women scientists
Scientists from Washington, D.C.
Drexel University alumni
Georgetown University Medical Center faculty
American women epidemiologists
American epidemiologists
University of Pittsburgh School of Public Health alumni
20th-century American women scientists
21st-century American women scientists
20th-century African-American women
20th-century African-American scientists
21st-century African-American women
21st-century African-American scientists
Members of the National Academy of Medicine